the Get Wets are a rhythm and blues band, originally from Columbia, South Carolina, with a 1960s garage rock and surf rock influence. The band was formed in 2006 by Mike Lee as a lark but evolved into a popular party band performing around South Carolina.

History

Early History

There have been several lineups, with Lee being the only constant member. One original song, "Beat Beat", was recorded in 2010 and appeared on the 2012 compilation, We Love Trash: the Best of the GaragePunk Hideout, volume 7.

Radio

The group performed live on two occasions on local music show the Columbia Beet airing on WUSC-FM. The song "Beat Beat" has also been heard on WXRY Unsigned, a show that airs independent bands from South Carolina.

Band

Mike Lee — lead vocals, tambourine (2006–present)

Joel Floyd — drums, backing vocals (2009–2012)

Jay Pou — bass, backing vocals (2009–2012)

Logan Goldstein — organ, backing vocals (2010–2012)

Rev. Joe Roberts — baritone saxophone (2012–2013)

Byron Chitty — baritone guitar, backing vocals (2012–2013)

Scotty Tempo — drums, backing vocals (2012–2013)

Discography

Compilations
 We Love Trash: the Best of the GaragePunk Hideout, volume 7 – GRGPNK Records (2012)
"Beat Beat"

References

External links
Official Facebook
Official Last.fm

American garage rock groups
Musical groups established in 2006
Musical groups from South Carolina